Reichskommissariat Don-Wolga, literally "Reich Commissariat Don-Volga", was a theoretical civilian occupation regime of Nazi Germany discussed during the early stages of German planning for its occupation of territories in the Soviet Union, one of several other Reichskommissariats. It is also referred to in German memoranda as simply the Dongebiet ("Don territory").

It was to stretch approximately from the Sea of Azov up to the Volga German Republic, an area without any natural boundaries, economic unity, or a homogenous population. Its slated capital was Rostov-on-Don. Dietrich Klagges, the Minister-President of Braunschweig, was proposed by Nazi leader Alfred Rosenberg as its Reichskommissar.

Although five occupation regimes had originally been envisaged for German-controlled Soviet territories, Reichskommissariat Don-Wolga was eventually dropped because it did not carry a specific political objective, and because the German authorities had decided by the second half of May 1941 to limit the number of administrative units that were to be established in the east to four. At Rosenberg's suggestion, its territory was divided between Reichskommissariat Ukraine and Reichskommissariat Kaukasus, which was accepted by Adolf Hitler. Other sources state its territory as covering 55.000 km2 and including only territory later added to Reichskommissariat Ukraine, comprising its eventually planned Generalbezirke Rostov, Voronezh, and Saratov.

References

Subdivisions of Nazi Germany
Proposed administrative territorial entities
Ukraine in World War II
Volga German people
Military history of Germany during World War II
Military history of the Soviet Union during World War II